Lewis Terrace is an Early Commercial style multiple dwelling building located at 68-82 N. 700 East in Provo, Utah.  It was listed on the National Register of Historic Places in 1983.

References

Residential buildings on the National Register of Historic Places in Utah
Buildings designated early commercial in the National Register of Historic Places
Residential buildings completed in 1906
National Register of Historic Places in Provo, Utah
1906 establishments in Utah